is a Japanese film director and cinematographer.

Overviews 

He won the award for best director at the 33rd Japan Academy Prize for Mt. Tsurugidake.

Filmography
 Submersion of Japan (1973)
 Mt. Tsurugidake
 Climbing to Spring (2014)
 Samurai's Promise (2018)

Honours
Person of Cultural Merit (2020)

References

External links
 

1939 births
Japanese cinematographers
Japanese film directors
Living people
People from Tokyo
Japan Academy Prize for Director of the Year winners
Persons of Cultural Merit